Frances Stebbins "Fanny" Allen (1854–1941) was an American photographer.

Allen was born in Deerfield, Massachusetts to Josiah Allis Allen and Mary, née Stebbins. She and her sister, Mary Electa Allen (1858–1941), were schoolteachers, who left teaching when they became deaf in their thirties.

Their deafness led Allen and her sister to take up photography. By 1895, they were permanently exhibiting and selling their prints from their families ancestral home. Many of their works were never attributed to one sister or the other, but to "the Misses Allen." Many of their idyllic images harken back to an idealized version of the region's colonial history. In 1899, the Allen sisters joined Deerfield's Arts and Crafts Movement, and began to document the works of its earliest members. In 1907, Frances Allen was elected Director of the Society of Deerfield Industries.

Family and education
Allen was one of four children born to Josiah and Mary Allen in the 1850s. She attended Deerfield Academy and then the State Normal School teacher's college in Westfield, Massachusetts.

References 

1854 births
1941 deaths
Schoolteachers from Massachusetts
American women educators
American women photographers
Deaf artists
People from Deerfield, Massachusetts
Photographers from Massachusetts
American deaf people